The Buhl IOOF Building in Buhl, Idaho is an Odd Fellows building that was built in 1919–20.  It served historically as a clubhouse, as a meeting hall, as a specialty store, and as a business.  It was designed in the early commercial style, perhaps the Chicago style. It was listed on the National Register of Historic Places in 1984.

Tourtellotte and Hummel architect Benjamin Morgan Nisbet designed the hall and also the adjacent Buhl City Hall.

See also
 List of Odd Fellows buildings

References

Cultural infrastructure completed in 1920
Buildings designated early commercial in the National Register of Historic Places
Odd Fellows buildings in Idaho
Buildings and structures in Twin Falls County, Idaho
Clubhouses on the National Register of Historic Places in Idaho
Commercial buildings in Idaho
National Register of Historic Places in Twin Falls County, Idaho